William J. Waite (born 29 November 1917) is a Welsh footballer who played as a centre forward in the Football League.

See also
Football in Wales
List of football clubs in Wales

References

External links

1917 births
1980 deaths
Welsh footballers
Footballers from Newport, Wales
Association football forwards
Oldham Athletic A.F.C. players
Worcester City F.C. players
English Football League players